Mantenópolis is a municipality located in the Brazilian state of Espírito Santo. Its population was 15,503 (2020) and its area is 321 km². It is a small town located in a valley with green mountains rising above it.  It has a central square with municipal offices- e.g., police, public works, and school within a short walking distance of each other.  There are many farms with livestock and crops in the neighboring countryside.  An extraordinarily large number of people from Mantenopolis who migrate to the United States reside on the Island of Martha's Vineyard in the state of Massachusetts.

References

Municipalities in Espírito Santo